Kappa Delta Rho has 85 chapters, including 34 active chapters (including those under reorganization) and 2 colonies (groups of intent and provisional chapters, depending on stage of colonization).


Chapters

External links
http://www.kdr.com/ – Official Site
http://www.kdrfoundation.org/ – Kappa Delta Rho Foundation

References

chapters
Lists of chapters of United States student societies by society